38th Street station may refer to:

38th Street station (Metro Transit), a station on the Hiawatha Line in Minneapolis. Minnesota, USA
38th Street/Washington station, a station on the METRO Light Rail in Phoenix, Arizona, USA
38th Street (IRT Sixth Avenue Line), a demolished elevated station in New York City.